Per Gustafsson or Per Gustavsson may refer to:

 Per Gustafsson Banér (1588-1644), privy councillor of Sweden
  (AKA Per Gustafsson, 1861-1951), Swedish psychiatrist
 Per Gustafsson i Benestad (1880-1942), Swedish politician
  (born 1951), Swedish author
  (born 1962), Swedish illustrator and author 
 Per M. Gustavsson (born 1965), researcher and advisor
 Per Gustafsson (born 1970), Swedish ice hockey player